The Philadelphia Story is a 1959 American TV adaptation of the play The Philadelphia Story by Philip Barry. It was directed by Fielder Cook.

Plot summary

Cast
 Gig Young as C.K. Dexter Haven
 Diana Lynn as Tracy Lord
 Christopher Plummer as Mike Connor
 Ruth Roman as Liz Imbrie
 Mary Astor as Margaret Lord
 Don DeFore as George Kitteridge
 Gaye Huston as Dinah Lord
 Leon Janney as Sidney Kidd
 Emory Richardson as Edward
 Alan Webb as Seth Lord

Production
It was produced by Talent Associates.

References

External links
 

1959 television films
1959 films
American films based on plays
American romantic comedy films
Films set in Philadelphia
NBC network original films
Television remakes of films
Films directed by Fielder Cook
1950s American films